Dassanayake Mudiyanselage Dassanayake (29 April 1953 – 8 January 2008) was a Sri Lankan politician from the Puttalam District. He was serving as a member of the Parliament of Sri Lanka and non-cabinet Minister of Nation Building when he was assassinated in a roadside bomb attack on 8 January 2008 in Ja-Ela, twelve miles north of Colombo. The attack, which was blamed on the militant Tamil Tigers organization, killed three people and injured ten others.

References
 

1953 births
2008 deaths
Assassinated Sri Lankan politicians
Deaths by improvised explosive device
Members of the 10th Parliament of Sri Lanka
Members of the 11th Parliament of Sri Lanka
Members of the 12th Parliament of Sri Lanka
Members of the 13th Parliament of Sri Lanka
People killed during the Sri Lankan Civil War